Asset poverty is an economic and social condition that is more persistent and prevalent than income poverty. It is a household’s inability to access wealth resources that are sufficient to provide for basic needs for a period of three months. Basic needs refer to the minimum standards for consumption and acceptable needs. Wealth resources consist of home ownership, other real estate (second home, rented properties, etc.), net value of farm and business assets, stocks, checking and savings accounts, and other savings (money in savings bonds, life insurance policy cash values, etc.). Wealth is measured in three forms: net worth, net worth minus home equity, and liquid assets. Net worth consists of all the aspects mentioned above. Net worth minus home equity is the same except it does not include home ownership in asset calculations. Liquid assets are resources that are readily available such as cash, checking and savings accounts, stocks, and other sources of savings. There are two types of assets: tangible and intangible. Tangible assets most closely resemble liquid assets in that they include stocks, bonds, property, natural resources, and hard assets not in the form of real estate. Intangible assets are simply the access to credit, social capital, cultural capital, political capital, and human capital.

There are trends in the development of asset poverty over time and several factors that cause certain groups to fall into asset poverty more easily than others. Changes in these factors and structures have occurred over the years, but asset poverty is continually higher than other forms of poverty such as income poverty. The reason for this difference is that asset poverty accounts for a household’s total wealth, and not just the current income level. It provides a more accurate description of a household’s true financial state. Wealth leads to increased economic security and assets create a form of security during hardship. One can use assets to pay for further education, better housing, or to maintain a certain standard of living after retirement. Households lacking sufficient assets are forced to live from paycheck to paycheck and face economic hardship when changes in income occur.  Those who lack adequate assets are unable to seek a better lifestyle and improve their quality of life because they lack the financial resources to do so.

By any measure, poverty in the United States is increasing. In 2010, the country saw the poverty rate for individuals rise to 15.1 percent, the highest level in nearly two decades. More than 46 million people now live below the federal poverty line of $22,350 for a family of four. However, the official poverty rate released annually by the Census Bureau highlights just one aspect of household finances, namely the percentage of people with insufficient income to cover their day-to-day expenses. It does not count the number of families who have insufficient resources – money in the bank or assets such as a home or a car – to meet emergencies or longer-term needs. When these longer-term needs are factored in, substantially more people in the United States today are facing a future of limited hope for long-term financial security.

According to the CFED 2013 Assets & Opportunity Scorecard, 44 percent of households – nearly half of Americans – are living in liquid asset poverty. These families do not have the savings or other assets to cover basic expenses (equivalent to what could be purchased with a poverty level income) for three months if a layoff or other emergency leads to loss of income.

The term asset poverty is also used in a low-income / poor countries context, where the poverty line may be taken at the international standard of $1.25 per day (or sometimes $2 per day).  Poor rural families in particular do not receive, say, $1 each day; but rather this is a daily average (or corresponds to a yearly average of $365). The asset poor might by chance have income above the poverty line for a time like a month, but their level of assets predict they will be poor in an average month.

Characteristics of asset poverty 

Those defined as asset poor share several significant characteristics. Education level, household structure (race, age, gender, marriage status), and home ownership are all unifying factors of the asset poor. Individuals who obtain a college degree are less likely to become asset poor than college dropouts, high school graduates, and high school dropouts. To be more specific, high school dropouts were three times as likely as college graduates to experience asset poverty in 1998. In terms of household structure, those who belong to female-headed households or non-elderly households with children are most likely to fall into asset poverty. Couples with no children or married elderly couples are least likely to fall into this position. In general, families with children are the second highest in rates of asset poverty, but they are half as likely to fall into this category if a father is present in the home. The race of the household also affects poverty rates because non-whites are twice as likely as whites to become asset poor. Contrary to what has been reported, from 1989-1998 asset poverty in White Americans actually increased, while asset poverty for African Americans decreased. Home ownership also plays a role in increasing or decreasing the likelihood of falling into asset poverty. Home renters suffer more severe asset poverty because they lack the most prevalent economic asset (a home) and because, on average, they have negative wealth.

Persistence of asset poverty 

Asset poverty, when measured in terms of net worth, demonstrates a lower percentage than when it is measured in terms of net worth minus home equity and liquid assets. This is because homes are the largest percentage of household wealth across the country and if they are factored out of the wealth equation, then total household wealth decreases significantly. Also, asset poverty is more likely to persist in several types of situations. First, it is most likely to persist in non-white, single-mother, and elderly households. Second, asset poverty endures in households where the head received little education. Higher education levels correlate with lower probabilities of remaining in asset poverty. Third, ending a marriage increases the likelihood of becoming asset poor, so single-parent households are more likely to become asset poor than two-parent households.

There are also several ways to try to avoid falling into poverty. First, getting married is a way to combine two individuals' assets and avoid poverty. Second, buying a home increases a household’s net worth. However, in order to be successful in helping low-income and asset-poor families escape impoverished lifestyles, home ownership needs to aid in building assets, improving housing, and creating higher-quality neighborhoods. Thirdly, obtaining an inheritance increases the chances that the poor will escape poverty and decreases the chances that the non-poor will fall into poverty.

Policies and conclusion 

The poor need to accumulate assets in order to decrease national percentages of asset poverty. One program policy aimed at helping the poor develop assets is Individual Development Accounts (IDAs). These accounts require financial education, they target the poor, and they provide funding through matches, not through tax breaks. IDAs also allow individuals to make deposits into insured and interest-bearing savings accounts. Income-focused poverty plans will not remedy the issue of asset poverty. Asset poverty will only decrease when the poor are able to acquire and sustain assets in order to accumulate wealth. Wealth provides economic protection in difficult financial times and it allows people to invest and prepare for the future. In conclusion, asset poverty appears to be a better measure of poverty in the United States. The probability of an individual or family to raise out of poverty would be illustrated better with asset poverty also.  Unlike income poverty, asset poverty incorporates the measure of wealth and transformative assets. The difference between income and wealth as mentioned above is that income is a steady source used to pay bills and take of day to day expenses. Wealth and Transformative assets, however, are long term sources of money that could be used in emergency situations; or, assist in improving one's living conditions or standards. If two families or individuals have the same income but differing levels of wealth or assets, the family with more assets would have a more definite wealth and be able to maintain their social and/or economic status during turbulent times.

See also
Poverty in the United States
Poverty threshold
Poverty

References

CFED. Corporation for Enterprise Development. www.cfed.org

Measurements and definitions of poverty